Bandobila Union is a union parishad in Bagherpara Upazila of Jessore District, in Khulna Division, Bangladesh.

References

Unions of Bagherpara Upazila